Farces et moralités (Farces and morality plays) is a collection of six comedy plays in one act, written by the French novelist and playwright Octave Mirbeau and published by Fasquelle in 1904:  Vieux ménages (Old couples), L’Épidémie (The Epidemic, Bloomington, University of Denver Press, 1949), Les Amants (The Lovers), Scrupules (Scruples, New York, Samuel French, 1923), Le Portefeuille (The Purse) and Interview.

Commentary 

As usual, Mirbeau demystifies and ridicules all that stupid people blindly respect: the law, which is oppressive by nature, and the police, which is arbitrary and repressive by definition; love, a deception, and marriage, a quagmire; wealth, ill-acquired, and social success, a deceptive façade; the newspapers, which anaesthetize people and provide false information, and the politicians, who are quite indifferent to social misery and concerned only with their own emoluments. Its great originality is to extend the challenge to language itself, thanks to which the dominant classes obtain the submission and the respect of the dominated and perpetuate an inegalitarian social order.

Mirbeau succeeds however in making us laugh at that which should really drive us to despair, in the hope that the spark of conscience will help us to live better, to exercise better our liberty of mind, and to rebel against social institutions.

Although placing itself in the continuity of medieval morality plays, which had a pedagogical and moralizing purpose, Mirbeau deliberately chose the mood of farce, in which exaggeration, acceleration of the rhythm, caricature, plays on words, the grotesque, and the absurd are acceptable and assure the indispensable distancing effect, without any realism. He anticipates all at once the theater of Bertolt Brecht, Marcel Aymé, Harold Pinter, and Eugène Ionesco.

External links 

 Octave Mirbeau, The Interview, translated by Walter Wykes (2009).
  Octave Mirbeau, Farces et moralités.
  Pierre Michel, Foreword.
  Pierre Michel, « Mirbeau, Ionesco et le théâtre de l’absurde », Cahiers Octave Mirbeau, n° 13, 2006, p. 163-174.

1904 plays
Comedy plays
Plays by Octave Mirbeau